Naiyer Masud (1936 – 24 July 2017) was an Indian Urdu scholar and short story writer.

Early life and education
Masud was born in Lucknow and spent nearly all his life there, working until his retirement as a Professor of Persian at Lucknow University.

Masud was the son of Masud Hassan Rizvi, also a Lucknow University Professor of Persian, a famed scholar of dastaan who was awarded the 'Padma Shri' for 'Literature and Education' in 1970.  He is the elder brother of the noted satirist Azhar Masud.

Career and honors
Masud is the author of many scholarly books and translations (notably of Kafka), but is best known for his short stories, collected in the volumes Ganjifa, Simiya, Itr-e-kaafoor, and Taoos Chaman Ki Myna. For the last, he was awarded the 2001 Urdu prize of the Sahitya Akademi and the Saraswati Samman in 2007.

He received the honor of being the subject of the entire 1997 issue of the Annual of Urdu Studies.

A large selection of his stories have been translated into English by M.U. Memon in the volumes The Snake Catcher and Essence of Camphor.

References
 
 A Taste for Secrecy: Reading Naiyer Masud. Almost Island, 2018
 M.U. Memon, Naiyer Masud: A Prefatory Note
 Lucknow University, Department of Urdu

1936 births
2017 deaths
Urdu-language writers from India
Indian Muslims
Recipients of the Sahitya Akademi Award in Urdu
Writers from Lucknow
Academic staff of the University of Lucknow
Urdu-language writers
Urdu-language short story writers
20th-century Indian short story writers